Nightclub management software (NMS) or a nightclub management system is a compiled management information system produced solely for nightclubs and can also be modified for bars, festivals, pubs, and live events. These systems will commonly cover the needs of nightclubs in the form of CRM, bookings, ticketing, EPOS, and administration capabilities for running the venue. With the nightclub industry in contraction during the period of recession during 2007-2009 many nightclubs are sourcing new avenues for marketing reach expansion.

Summary

Nightclub management software solutions typically cover a broad spectrum of aspects in running a venue such as:
Tracking Bookings
Stock Management
Electronic point of sale terminals

The standard NMS forgoes the traditional software installation and instead relies on cloud computing storing all data on remote servers which allow for user access for an unlimited number of computers based anywhere within reach of an internet connection. Many NMS providers base the pricing structure from a software as a service/application service provider model.

Nightclubs use specific software to meet the complex requirements of their business. Typically small scale venues will manage their business with a generic accounting package and extend functionality with plugin's or other bolt-on software. The advantage for nightclubs running a specialized system are numerous, however the primary outcome is a more efficient venue. Nightclub Management software typically encompasses all the tools mentioned above however difficulty arises when nightclub staff are evaluating vendors and deciding what software to implement. Integration of these tools is key but venue principals and other key staff still need to pay attention to other factors such as cost.

References

External links 
 

Business software
Management systems